The Forum of International Respiratory Societies is a respiratory health advocacy organization which consists of the following organizations:
The Asociacion Latinoamericana del Thorax
The American College of Chest Physicians
The American Thoracic Society
The Asian Pacific Society of Respirology
The European Respiratory Society
The International Union Against Tuberculosis and Lung Disease, and 
The Pan African Thoracic Society.
The Forum was established in 2002 and has more than 70,000 members worldwide. It is based in Lausanne, Switzerland.
In 2010, the Forum dubbed the year 2010 the "Year of the Lung".

References

Organizations established in 2002
Organisations based in Lausanne
2002 establishments in Switzerland
Pulmonology and respiratory therapy organizations
International medical and health organizations